Psychonaut is the second studio album by krautrock band Brainticket. It is often described as more relaxed and less experimental than their first record.

Track listing
 "Radagacuca" (Joel Vandroogenbroeck, Montedoro) – 7:21
 "One Morning" (Joel Vandroogenbroeck) – 3:52
 "(There's a Shadow) Watchin' You" (Joel Vandroogenbroeck) – 4:33
 "Like a Place in the Sun" (Joel Vandroogenbroeck) – 6:26
 "Feel the Wind Blow" (Joel Vandroogenbroeck) – 3:30
 "Coc'o Mary" (Joel Vandroogenbroeck) – 6:06

Personnel

The Band
 Jane Free - Lead Vocals, Tbilat, Tambourine, Slide Whistle, Sounds
 Joel Vandroogenbroeck - Organ, Piano, Flute, Sitar, Sanze Vocal, Rumors, Generator, Arrangements
 Rolf Hug - Lead Guitar, Acoustic Guitar, Tablas, Vocals
 Martin Sacher: Electric Bass, Flute
 Barney Palm - Drums, Percussion, Strange Sounds
 Carol Muriel - Speaking on "Like a Place in the Sun" and oooh... oooh... on "Feel the Wind Blow"
 Peter - Witch Doctor and Good Vibes.

Technical staff
 All Songs published by DURIUM
 Cover by UMBERTO SANTUCCI
 Recorded at DURIUM STUDIOS, Milano
 Engineers: UGO SCERBO and PIERO BISLERI
 Produced by BRAINTICKET

References

External links
[ Psychonaut] at Allmusic

Brainticket albums
1972 albums
Bellaphon Records albums